Despite abundant natural resources and a relatively small population, New Zealand is a net importer of energy, in the form of petroleum products. The ratio of non-renewable and renewable energy sources was fairly consistent from 1975 to 2008, with about 70 percent of primary energy supply coming from hydrocarbon fuels. This ratio decreased to about 60 percent in 2018. The proportion of non-renewable energy varies annually, depending on water flows into hydro-electricity lakes and demand for energy. In 2018, approximately 60% of primary energy was from non-renewable hydrocarbon fuels and 40% was from renewable sources. In 2007 energy consumption per capita was 120 gigajoules. Per capita energy consumption had increased 8 per cent since 1998. New Zealand uses more energy per capita than 17 of 30 OECD countries. New Zealand is one of 13 OECD countries that does not operate nuclear power stations.

From 1994 to 2018, the energy intensity of the economy per unit of GDP declined by 33 percent to 2.57 MJ/$. A contributing factor is the growth of relatively less energy-intensive service industries.

Energy supply

Coal 

Coal is produced from 18 opencast mines. Over 80% of New Zealand's coal reserves are contained in Southland lignite deposits. Most coal production is of bituminous and sub-bituminous coals, and most of this is exported.

Oil and gas 

Oil and gas is produced from 21 petroleum licenses / permits, all in the Taranaki basin. The most important fields are Kapuni, Maui, Pohokura and Kupe. Exploration for oil and gas reserves includes the Great South Basin and offshore areas near Canterbury and Gisborne. Reticulated natural gas is available in most major North Island towns and cities.

Renewable energy 

Approximately 40% of primary energy is from renewable energy sources. Approximately 80% of electricity comes from renewable energy, primarily hydropower and geothermal power. Studies have shown that it is technically feasible to provide 100% of the electricity demand by renewable power without risking with shortages in energy supply.

Energy consumption

International comparisons 

In terms of energy intensity, New Zealand is just a little lower than the global average.

Electrical energy 

Electrical energy in New Zealand is mainly derived from renewable energy sources such as from hydropower, geothermal power and wind energy. The large share of renewable energy sources makes New Zealand one of the most sustainable countries in terms of energy generation. Electricity demand increased by an average of 2.1% per year from 1974 to 2008 and since then has been relatively constant overall.

Governmental jurisdiction 
The Ministry of Business, Innovation and Employment is responsible for economic issues surrounding energy use and the Ministry for the Environment addresses the environmental impact of energy use in New Zealand. Exploration and production of fossil fuels comes under Crown Minerals, a division of the Ministry of Economic Development. The Energy Efficiency and Conservation Authority is responsible for preparing a statutory national energy efficiency and conservation strategy for approval by the administering Minister.

See also

Economy of New Zealand
Hydroelectric power in New Zealand
Climate change in New Zealand

References

Further reading

External links
Energy and Resources page at the Ministry of Economic Development
New Zealand Energy Strategy at the Ministry of Economic Development
Ministry for the Environment – energy issues
Energy Efficiency and Conservation Authority
Energywise – a consumer guide for energy conservation operated by Energy Efficiency and Conservation Authority
New Zealand Energy Sector Excellence Awards – Annual New Zealand Energy Sector Excellence Awards